The Mount Dora History Museum (formerly the Royellou Museum) is located at 450 Royellou Lane, Mount Dora, Florida. It contains exhibits depicting the history of Mount Dora. The building itself, constructed in the 1920s, was originally the firehouse and jail for the city.

See also
Mount Dora Museum of Speed

References

External links
Mount Dora Historical Society (official website)

Museums in Lake County, Florida
Historical society museums in Florida
History museums in Florida
Mount Dora, Florida